Ed Brown (born 1963) is an American race car driver in the United SportsCar Championship.

Racing career
He was the overall winner at the 2016 24 Hours of Daytona and the 2016 12 Hours of Sebring, both for Tequila Patrón ESM.

Brown also competed in the 2015 24 Hours of Le Mans and the 2016 24 Hours of Le Mans.

24 Hours of Le Mans results

WeatherTech SportsCar Championship results
(key)(Races in bold indicate pole position, Results are overall/class)

Business career
Brown was president and CEO of Patrón Spirits Company, and founder of Extreme Speed Motorsports, the racing team for whom he drove. ESM was sponsored by Patrón.

References

External links

1963 births
American racing drivers
Living people
American Le Mans Series drivers
Rolex Sports Car Series drivers
24 Hours of Daytona drivers
24 Hours of Le Mans drivers
WeatherTech SportsCar Championship drivers
FIA World Endurance Championship drivers
12 Hours of Sebring drivers
Extreme Speed Motorsports drivers
Racing drivers from Florida
Racing drivers from Tampa, Florida
Sportspeople from Tampa, Florida